Mirella D'Angelo (born 16 August 1956) is an Italian actress.

Career
Mirella D'Angelo has appeared in more than twenty films since 1974 and acted in television and theatre. She has appeared in a number of notable films including Le Guignolo with Jean-Paul Belmondo, Apartment Zero with Colin Firth, Caligula with Malcolm McDowell and Helen Mirren, Dario Argento's Tenebrae and Federico Fellini's City of Women.

Filmography

Cinema
Terminal, directed by Paolo Breccia (1974)
A Special Cop in Action, directed by Marino Girolami (1976)
La tigre è ancora viva: Sandokan alla riscossa!, directed by Sergio Sollima (1977)
Porca società, directed by Luigi Russo (1978)
Il ritorno di Casanova, directed by Pasquale Festa Campanile (1978)
Caligula, with Malcolm McDowell and Helen Mirren, directed by Tinto Brass (1979)
C'est dingue... mais on y va, directed by Michel Gerard (1979)
Turi and the Paladins, directed by Angelo D'Alessandro (1979)
Lessons for the Lovelorn, directed by Mario Garriba (1980)
City of Women, directed by Federico Fellini (1980)
Le Guignolo, with Jean-Paul Belmondo, directed by Georges Lautner (1980)
Putain d'histoire d'amour, directed by Gilles Béhat (1981)
Tenebrae, directed by Dario Argento (1982)  
Hercules, directed by Luigi Cozzi (1983)
Il cavaliere, la morte e il diavolo, directed by Beppe Cino (1983)
Apartment Zero, with Colin Firth, directed by Martin Donovan (1988)
Maya, directed by Marcello Avallone (1989)
Il ritorno del grande amico, directed by Giorgio Molteni (1990)
The Pope Must Die, directed by Peter Richardson (1991)
Dana Lech, directed by Frank Blasberg (1992)
Hard Men, directed by J.K. Amalou (1996)
I piccoli maghi di Oz, directed by Luigi Cozzi (2018)

Short films
Smuggler, directed by Florence Dewavrin (1982)
Lettura in nero, directed by Antonello De Leo (1989)
Quel buio senza silenzio, directed by Stefano Oreto (1991)
 "Sissy" directed by Eitan Pitigliani (2022)

Television
L'étrange monsieur Duvallier, directed by Victor Vicas, (France,1978)
Stamboul Train, by Graham Greene, directed by Gianfranco Mingozzi (Italy/Hungary, 1980)
Embassy, directed by Robert Michael Lewis (USA, 1985)
Turno di notte, directed by Luigi Cozzi (Serie TV) (Italy, 1987)
The Nightmare Years, directed by Anthony Page (USA, 1989)
Un cane sciolto, directed by Giorgio Capitani (Italy,1990)
Der Schwammerlkönig, directed by Rüdiger Nüchtern (Germany,1988)
Harry, directed by Martin Stellman (UK, 1993)
Flash - Der Fotoreporter, directed by Gero Erhardt (Germany, 1993)
The Glam Metal Detectives, directed by Peter Richardson (UK, 1995)

Theatre
Look Back in Anger, by John Osborne, directed by Daniele Griggio (1983)
Romantic Comedy, by Bernard Slade, directed by Giorgio Albertazzi (1985)

Music Video
Insolito, written and performed by Francesco Di Giacomo (2019), directed by Fabio Massimo Iaquone

References

External links
 

1956 births
Living people
Actresses from Rome
Italian film actresses